Sabla is a market center in Myanglung Municipality in the Himalayas of Terhathum District in the Kosi Zone of eastern Nepal. Formerly a Village Development Committee this place was merged to form the new municipality since 18 May 2014. At the time of the 1991 Nepal census it had a population of 2184 people living in 389 individual households.

Main Occupation

References

2. SABLA
sabla.org.in/

External links
UN map of the municipalities of Terhathum District

Populated places in Tehrathum District